Saint Michael's Catholic High School is a co-educational secondary school and sixth form located in the town of Watford, Hertfordshire. In September 2010, headteacher John Murphy was succeeded by Edward Conway.

History

Saint Michael's Catholic High School was founded by the Dominican Sisters in 1955, opening its gates for the first time in September of the same year. The choice of location was a direct result of an influx of families moving out of Central and North West London to South Hertfordshire, many of whom were of Irish and/or Italian descent. Before Saint Michael's opened, there was no Roman Catholic Secondary School in the county. This caused considerable challenges to the existing Holy Rood Primary School, which provided education to the age of 14. The opening of St Michael's was planned in conjunction with new feeder primaries. 

The school became a comprehensive school in 1966, thus catering for the full range of student abilities. This brought with it the first significant enlargement of the facilities. The science laboratories and new classrooms supplemented the original main corridor as part of the restructuring. In the 1990s the school spent a period of time under grant-maintained schools status. This led to the construction of the current administration block. Since 2000 there has been considerable upgrading of existing buildings in addition to construction of completely new wings. The first of these was the Saint Martin de Porres wing which houses the English department and Drama Studio. Next came a floodlit astroturf, providing all-weather outdoor sports facilities. Then came Saint Mary's wing, housing the Geography department and a media centre. 

In September 2005, Saint Michael's Catholic High School became a Humanities specialist college. A new Sixth Form block, the Aquinas Centre, was opened in September 2008, followed by the new Saint Bernadette Sports Hall in March 2010. The additional funding that came with this accolade was primarily used to construct the Saint Mary's wing. The school is now an academy, part of the Diocese of Westminster Academy Trust.

Pastoral structure
The school standard intake number is 168, but can accommodate up to 180 students per annum in six tutor groups. Each tutor group is named after a monastic institution of learning, namely: Fountains Abbey, Iona Abbey, Abbey of Kells, Lindisfarne Abbey, Rievaulx Abbey and Whitby Abbey. Students generally remain with the same tutor group throughout their education and year groups are therefore crossed vertically by house groups. Assemblies are conducted in year groups whereas school Masses are celebrated in house groups. Each year group is led by a Pastoral Academic Learning Co-Ordinator (PALC), who is in turn supported by six tutors and additional staff. Students aged 16–18 progress into the Sixth Form.

Community
The community choir regularly sings in neighbouring parishes, both Roman Catholic, Anglican and other denominations. The orchestra regularly performs at Saint Mary's Church in central Watford. Both the choir and orchestra are regularly involved in Archdiocesan liturgical celebrations. The school regularly produces its news magazine, The Word. Since September 2007, this has been sponsored by the Watford Observer newspaper, which publishes the magazine on a termly basis a supplement to its newspaper.

Partnerships
The Garston Campus partnership involves Saint Michael's Catholic High School and Parmiter's School, both of which are situated on High Elms Lane. Inter-school departmental meetings take place twice per academic year. The 14–19 St Alban's Consortium comprises St Michael's Catholic High School, Nicholas Breakspear School, St Albans Girls' School and Loreto College. The Consortium was formed in response to the government's Extended Schools initiative. Saint Michael's Catholic High School is the hub school for this group.

Notable former pupils
 Adam Bowden is a member of the England Athletics Team. 
 Nigel Callaghan played for Watford F.C., Aston Villa F.C. and Derby County F.C. He also represented England at Under-21 level.
 Craig Mackail-Smith plays for Brighton & Hove Albion of the Football League Championship
 Gary Phillips played for and then managed Barnet F.C.
 Paul Robinson currently plays for Bolton Wanderers F.C. on loan from West Bromwich Albion F.C.

Notable former staff
 Eryl McNally was Member of the European Parliament for the East of England.

Catholic secondary schools in the Archdiocese of Westminster
Schools in Three Rivers District
Secondary schools in Hertfordshire
Educational institutions established in 1955
1955 establishments in England
Academies in Hertfordshire